The 1975–76 Serie A season was won by Torino.

Teams
Perugia, Como and Hellas Verona had been promoted from Serie B while Vicenza , Ternana and Varese was relegated to Serie B.

Classification

Results

Top goalscorers

References and sources
Almanacco Illustrato del Calcio - La Storia 1898-2004, Panini Edizioni, Modena, September 2005

External links
 :it:Classifica calcio Serie A italiana 1976 - Italian version with pictures and info.
  - All results on RSSSF Website.

1975-76
Italy
1